The Distants were an American indie rock band, based out of Los Angeles, California.

Members 
 Guinevere King: Vocals
 David Kelly: Guitar
 Jamie Douglass: Drums
 Steve Alderfer: Bass (2004-2007)
 Ben Jindra: Bass (2007–present)

By the beginning of 2008, undisclosed but implicitly tragic personal reasons had seen King suddenly depart from the band, leading the remaining three members to form a side project named Echo Hawk. Kelly's death shortly afterwards on March 30, 2008, effectively signalled the end of both bands.

Discography

The Distants 
The LP Broken Gold was released in 2006. It was produced by Kelly. King recalled that much of the content related to loss, as her brother had died two years previously.
 The Further the Earth Gets from the Sun
 Falling Apart
 The Moth Song
 She Sells Sanctuary
 Girl on Girl
 It's Over
 Vertigo
 Apparent Silence
 February
 The Following
 Apparent Silence [Multimedia Track]

In 2007, the band performed a cover version of the Echo and The Bunnymen song The Killing Moon, which was included on the Blood & Chocolate soundtrack.

The band's second album, an EP named Be Your Shadow, was almost completed at the time of Kelly's death. Containing the tracks "Highways", "Luminol", "Be Your Shadow", "Chemical Burn", and "Let's Catch Fire", it was never released.

Echo Hawk 
A single EP, Stiches, was released in February 2008.
 Opposites Attack
 SOS (Good Gurls Are Gone)
 Hostess
 Don't. Stop.
 Stitches

References

External links 
 The Distants' official Myspace page
 The Echo Hawk's official Myspace page

Indie rock musical groups from California
Musical groups from Los Angeles